Cars 2 (also known as Cars 2: The Video Game) is a 2011 racing game based on the 2011 film of the same name. Originally announced at E3 2011, the game was released by Disney Interactive Studios on all major platforms in North America on June 21, 2011, and in Australia two days later. The game was released in Europe on July 22, 2011. Versions for the Nintendo 3DS and PlayStation Portable were released later that year in November. The game features an array of Cars characters competing in spy adventures, as well as racing. The game received mixed reviews from critics.

Gameplay

In Cars 2, a third-person racing game, players have a choice of 25 different characters and train to become world-class spies. As part of training, players participate in missions using high-tech gadgets, for example, to avoid enemies or slow them down.

The game has three types of trophies: bronze, silver, and gold. Points are awarded at different values depending on what type of vehicle class players use. The game characters are divided into three weight-classes: heavy, medium, and light. Players can unlock new cars, tracks, and missions by collecting emblems. Drop-in/drop-out multiplayer modes support up to four players simultaneously.

Synopsis
Based on Pixar's computer animated film, Cars 2: The Video Game follows the exploits of car characters Lightning McQueen and Mater as they train in a secret facility known as CHROME, short for Command Headquarters for Recon Operations and Motorized Espionage. They are joined by British Intelligence agents Finn McMissile and Holley Shiftwell as they attempt to become the car-equivalent of spies. Several characters from the Cars 2 film appear, with additional characters from the first film and Cars Toons animated shorts available as downloadable content.

Development

The game was first shown to the public at E3 2011. It was also unveiled at the American International Toy Fair in New York City. According to a video interview on Game Line, John Day, the producer of the game, said they wanted to create a good family racing game and add a few things that perhaps no one has seen before. Avalanche Software was working in close collaboration with Pixar artists to bring the humor and personality of the feature film to life.

Reception

Cars 2 received mixed reviews from critics, with a score of 72 and 74 on Metacritic for the Xbox 360 and PlayStation 3 versions respectively. IGN gave the game an 8 out of 10 rating, stating that "Cars 2 is a great multiplayer game that rivals Mario Kart." The Official Xbox Magazine gave it a 7.5 out of 10 rating, praising fun and polished racing but criticizing the fact that online play was missing from the title. Game Informer gave the title a 7.75 out of 10 rating, calling it a satisfying racing experience. GameSpot Justin Calvert gave it a 7.5 out of 10 rating, praising its career mode and track designs. He was, however, upset that there was no online mode as expected and also no free roam unlike its predecessors.

References

External links

2011 video games
Avalanche Software games
Cars (franchise) video games
Disney video games
Sony Interactive Entertainment games
IOS games
Nintendo DS games
Nintendo 3DS games
Wii games
Xbox 360 games
MacOS games
PlayStation 3 games
PlayStation Portable games
Racing video games
Third-person shooters
Vehicular combat games
Video games based on animated films
Video games developed in the United States
Sports video games set in Italy
Video games set in Tokyo
Video games set in Arizona
Video games set in London
Wii Wheel games
Windows games
Multiplayer and single-player video games
Firebrand Games games